Nangloi Jat  or popularly known as "Nangloi" is a locality in West district in the Union Territory of Delhi in India, surrounded by Paschim Vihar, Delhi Outer Ring road, Najafgarh

Hastsal ki Laat is situated at corner of Hastsal village near Nangloi Jat, popularly known as the Laat, the 75-feet high minar (tower) was built by Mughal Emperor Shahjahan in 1650 and served as his hunting lodge. It resembles the Qutub Minar in design and is also made with red sandstone.

Demographics
 India census, Nangloi Jat had a population of 150,371. Males constitute 55% of the population and females 45%. Nangloi Jat has an average literacy rate of 63%, higher than the national average of 59.5%: male literacy is 71%, and female literacy is 53%. In Nangloi Jat, 17% of the population is under 6 years of age.

References

Neighbourhoods in Delhi